Lahmar is a town and commune, and capital of Lahmar District, in Béchar Province, western Algeria. According to the 2008 census its population is 1,969, up from 1,404 in 1998, and its population growth rate is 3.5%, the highest in the province.

Geography

One prominent range of hills is just to the east, and separates Lahmar from the nearby locality of Sfissifa.

Climate

Lahmar has a hot desert climate, with very hot summers and cool winters, and very little precipitation throughout the year. Winter nights can be quite chilly due to Lahmar's altitude.

Economy

Agriculture is the main industry in Lahmar. There are a total of 57,000 date palms planted in the commune. As of 2009 there were 8,430 sheep, 2,003 goats, and 80 cattle, the highest number of cattle for any commune in the province. There were also 106,800 chickens in 3 buildings, and 165 bee hives.

Infrastructure and housing

100% of Lahmar's population is connected to drinking water, 100% are connected to the sewerage system, and 99% (including 562 buildings) have access to electricity. There are no fuel service stations in the town; the nearest is in Béchar.

Lahmar has a total of 607 houses, of which 361 are occupied, giving an occupation rate of 5.5 inhabitants per occupied building. This is the lowest such rate in Béchar Province.

Transportation
A local road leads to the provincial capital of Béchar,  to the south.

Education

There are 2 elementary schools, with 11 classrooms including 9 in use. There are a total of 539 school students.

3.3% of the population has a tertiary education, and another 16.3% has competed secondary education. The overall literacy rate is 88.1%, and is 92.7% among males and 83.2% among females - all the highest in the province.

Health

Lahmar has a polyclinic, a room care facility and a maternity ward. The nearest hospital is in Béchar.

Religion

Lahmar has 3 operational mosques, with another 1 under construction.

Localities

Lahmar consists of two localities:
Lahmar
Sfissifa

References

Neighbouring towns and cities

Communes of Béchar Province